Ignacio "Nacho" Fernández Rodríguez (born 12 February 1980 in Oviedo, Asturias) is a Spanish former professional footballer who played as a midfielder.

External links

1980 births
Living people
Footballers from Oviedo
Spanish footballers
Association football midfielders
La Liga players
Segunda División players
Segunda División B players
Tercera División players
Real Oviedo Vetusta players
Deportivo Alavés B players
Deportivo Alavés players
Racing de Ferrol footballers
SD Ponferradina players
UD Logroñés players
Caudal Deportivo footballers
Real Avilés CF footballers
CD Covadonga players